"A Thousand Trees" is the third single released by Welsh rock band Stereophonics. The song is taken from their debut album, Word Gets Around (1997), and was released on 11 August 1997. It reached number 22 on the UK Singles Chart.

The title and the lyric "It only takes one tree to make a thousand matches but only takes one match to burn a thousand trees" came from the back of a box of England's Glory matches.

Track listings
All music was composed by Kelly Jones, Richard Jones and Stuart Cable. All lyrics were written by Kelly Jones except where indicated.

CD 1
 "A Thousand Trees" – 3:03
 "Carrot Cake & Wine" – 4:27
 "A Thousand Trees" (Live at Oxford Zodiac 23.3.97) – 3:39

CD 2 - Acoustic EP
 "A Thousand Trees"
 "Home to Me"
 "Looks Like Chaplin"
 "Summertime" (George Gershwin, DuBose Heyward)

7-inch vinyl
 "A Thousand Trees" – 3:03
 "Carrot Cake & Wine" – 4:27

Charts

Certifications

Other versions
 A live version of "A Thousand Trees" and "Carrot Cake & Wine" is included in the live album Live From Dakota.
 The video can be found on the Call Us What You Want But Don't Call Us in the Morning DVD.
 The song is also performed on the Live at Cardiff Castle, Live at Morfa Stadium and Live from Dakota DVDs.

References

1997 singles
1997 songs
Stereophonics songs
Songs written by Kelly Jones
V2 Records singles